William Patrick Garnett (born April 22, 1960) is an American former professional basketball player who was selected by the Dallas Mavericks in the first round (4th overall) of the 1982 NBA Draft. Born in Kansas City, Missouri, Garnett is a 6'9" small forward from the University of Wyoming, Garnett played in 4 NBA seasons from 1982 to 1986 for the Mavericks and Indiana Pacers. In his NBA career, Garnett played in 300 games and scored a total of 1,638 points.

External links
Bill Garnett's NBA statistics, basketballreference.com

1960 births
Living people
All-American college men's basketball players
American expatriate basketball people in Italy
American men's basketball players
Basketball coaches from Missouri
Basketball players from Kansas City, Missouri
Dallas Mavericks draft picks
Dallas Mavericks players
Fortitudo Pallacanestro Bologna players
Indiana Pacers players
Metro State Roadrunners men's basketball coaches
Scaligera Basket Verona players
Small forwards
Sportspeople from Kansas City, Missouri
Wyoming Cowboys basketball players